Nuctemeron Descent is the third full length studio album by the blackened death metal band Abominator. It was released on Osmose Productions in 2003.

Track listing
Dimensions of Mammon Enshroud - 5:01
Cascading Carnage - 5:47
Necrosexual Thrust - 5:17
Intoxicated with Satanic Hate - 6:06
Black Flames of Expulsion - 3:58
Scourge Immortalised - 5:39
Nuctemeron Descent - 4:43
Hymn to Baphomet - 2:23
The Ultimate Ordinance of Obliteration - 6:45

External links
Homepage

[ Release] at Allmusic

2003 albums
Abominator albums